Gnorismoneura calyptrimorpha is a moth of the family Tortricidae. It is found in Vietnam.

The wingspan is 16 mm for males and 17 mm for females. The ground colour of the forewings is cream with brownish suffusions and dots. The spots along the costa are brownish grey. The markings are grey brown with darker parts and ochreous disperse scales. The hindwings are pale grey cream.

Etymology
The specific epithet refers to the shape of the sitting moth and is derived from Greek calyptra (meaning a cover) and morphe (meaning shape).

References

Moths described in 2008
Archipini
Moths of Asia
Taxa named by Józef Razowski